Adrià Figueras Trejo (born 31 August 1988) is a Spanish handball player for C' Chartres MHB  and the Spanish team.

He participated at the 2017 World Men's Handball Championship.

Individual awards
Liga ASOBAL MVP: 2016 and 2018
Liga ASOBAL All-Team: 2016, 2017 and 2018

References

External links

1988 births
Living people
Sportspeople from Barcelona
Spanish male handball players
Liga ASOBAL players
BM Granollers players
FC Barcelona Handbol players
Handball players from Catalonia
Expatriate handball players
Spanish expatriate sportspeople in France
Handball players at the 2020 Summer Olympics
Medalists at the 2020 Summer Olympics
Olympic bronze medalists for Spain
Olympic medalists in handball
Competitors at the 2018 Mediterranean Games
Mediterranean Games bronze medalists for Spain
Mediterranean Games medalists in handball
21st-century Spanish people